The Longeau is a  long river in the Grand Est of northeastern France. It rises in Hannonville-sous-les-Côtes and runs generally northeast to join the river Yron at Jarny.

References

Rivers of France
Rivers of Grand Est
Rivers of Meuse (department)
Rivers of Meurthe-et-Moselle
Grand Est region articles needing translation from French Wikipedia